Myeonghak Station is a train station on Line 1 of the Seoul Subway. It is located in the city of Anyang in Gyeonggi-do.

Vicinity
Exit 1 : Myeonghak Elementary
Exit 2 : DongA apartment

References

Seoul Metropolitan Subway stations
Metro stations in Anyang, Gyeonggi
Railway stations opened in 1974